Puso ng Pasko: Artista Challenge ( is a 2010 Philippine television reality show broadcast by GMA Network. Hosted by Richard Gutierrez, Vicky Morales, Rhian Ramos and Drew Arellano, it premiered on December 6, 2010. The show concluded on December 31, 2010 with a total of 20 episodes.

Premise

It is the first ever reality Krismaserye (Christmas series). The show features 12 groups of Kapuso celebrities competing in various challenges and win for the 12 families and communities (1 for each pair). Over P5 million in cash and prizes will be awarded to the 12 partner families.

Challengers
Green team
 Carla Abellana and Geoff Eigenmann
 Paolo Contis and Sam Pinto
 Benjie Paras and Bubbles Paraiso
 Mariz Umali and Raffy Tima (winners)

Red team
 Jennica Garcia and Carl Guevarra
 Bianca King and Aljur Abrenica
 Heart Evangelista and Ervic Vijandre
 Rachelle Ann Go and Kris Lawrence

Blue team
 Kris Bernal and Rocco Nacino
 Gwen Zamora and Fabio Ide
 Ynna Asistio and Mark Herras
 Cesar Montano and Sunshine Cruz

Ratings
According to AGB Nielsen Philippines' Mega Manila People/Individual television ratings, the pilot episode of Puso ng Pasko: Artista Challenge earned a 9.1% rating.

References

External links
 

2010 Philippine television series debuts
2010 Philippine television series endings
Christmas television series
Filipino-language television shows
GMA Network original programming
GMA Integrated News and Public Affairs shows
Philippine reality television series